Käru is a small borough in Türi Parish, Järva County, Estonia. Before the administrative reform in 2017, Käru was the administrative centre of Käru Parish.

Käru has a railway station on the Tallinn - Viljandi railway line operated by Elron (rail transit).

Käru manor
Käru was established as an estate in the mid-18th century. The present building was built in 1878 and designed by Riga architect Robert Pflug. It is an eclectic building with mainly neo-Renaissance elements. It was damaged during the Revolution of 1905 and also during World War II. The manor house ensemble has several well-preserved and unusual outbuildings and annexes.

Explorer Karl von Ditmar was the landowner of Käru.

Economist Ragnar Nurkse (1907–1959) was born in Käru Manor.

Gallery

See also
 List of palaces and manor houses in Estonia

References

External links

 Käru Parish 

Boroughs and small boroughs in Estonia
Manor houses in Estonia
Kreis Pernau